Wendy Scase is the Geoffrey Shepherd Professor of Medieval English Literature at the University of Birmingham. She is currently researching the material histories of English medieval literature, studying a range of material from one-sheet texts to the largest surviving Middle English manuscript.

Education & Career 

Scase is a specialist in medieval English language and literature.

Scase began her academic career as an undergraduate in English and American Literature at the University of Kent. She then moved to Oxford where she took an MPhil in English Medieval Studies 1100–1500, followed by a DPhil. From 1987 to 1990 she held a British Academy Post-doctoral Fellowship (PDF) at the University of Oxford to study Medieval religious and polemical literature.

Following completion of her PDF she took up a post lecturing in English at the University of Hull, where she founded the Hull Centre for Medieval Studies in 2008. In 1999 she took up the Geoffrey Shepherd chair in Medieval English Literature at the University of Birmingham.

She is director of the Vernon Manuscript Project (in collaboration with the Bodleian Library, Oxford), and the Electronic Catalogue of Vernacular Manuscript Books of the Medieval West Midlands project. She is also a partner in the Manuscripts Online project.

Scase is founding co-editor of New Medieval Literatures, with Rita Copeland (University of Pennsylvania) and David Lawton (Washington University in St. Louis).  She was previously a general editor for the Medieval Texts and Cultures of Northern Europe book series published by Brepols. She is currently a member of the editorial board of the journal Speculum.

Select Bibliography 

 1989: Piers Plowman and the New Anticlericalism. Cambridge Studies in Medieval Literature 4. Cambridge University Press (repr. 2007)
 2007: Literature and Complaint in England, 1272–1553. Oxford University Press
 2007: (ed.) Essays in Manuscript Geography: Vernacular Manuscripts of the English West Midlands from the Conquest to the Sixteenth Century, Brepols
 2008: (ed.) (with R. Copeland and D. Lawton). New Medieval Literatures, vols 1-7 (Oxford: Clarendon Press, 1997–2005); vols 8–14, (Turnhout: Brepols, 2006–13).
 2010: Late Fourteenth-Century Poetry (Chaucer, Gower, Langland and their Legacy). In (ed. M. S. C. O’Neill) The Cambridge History of English Poetry. Cambridge University Press
 2010: (ed.) The Vernon Manuscript: A Facsimile Edition, Bodleian Digital Texts 3. Bodleian Library. 
 2011: The Making of the Vernon Manuscript: The Production and Contexts of Oxford, Bodleian Library, MS Eng. poet.a.1, Early Book Society Texts and Transitions: Studies in the History of Manuscripts and Early Printed Books. Brepols
 2013: Latin Composition Lessons, Piers Plowman, and the Piers Plowman Tradition. In (eds. Frank Grady and Andrew Galloway) Answerable Style: The Idea of the Literary in Medieval England. Ohio State

References 

Living people
Year of birth missing (living people)
Place of birth missing (living people)
Alumni of the University of Oxford
Alumni of the University of Kent
Academics of the University of Birmingham
British medievalists
Women medievalists
British women historians